The Cincinnati Reds' 1995 season was a season in American baseball. It consisted of the Reds winning the National League Central, and the National League Division Series in three straight games over the Los Angeles Dodgers before losing the National League Championship Series in four games to the eventual World Series champion Atlanta Braves.

Offseason
 October 13, 1994: Jacob Brumfield was traded by the Reds to the Pittsburgh Pirates for Danny Clyburn.
 November 3, 1994: Joe Oliver was released by the Reds.
 November 4, 1994: Damon Berryhill was signed as a free agent by the Reds.
 December 1, 1994: Kevin Maas was released by the Reds.
 December 22, 1994: Jack Morris was signed as a free agent by the Reds.

Regular season

Season standings

Record vs. opponents

Notable transactions
 April 5, 1995: Eric Anthony was signed as a free agent by the Reds.
 May 3, 1995: Tim Belcher was signed as a free agent by the Reds.
 May 15, 1995: Tim Belcher was traded by the Reds to the Seattle Mariners for Roger Salkeld.
 June 12, 1995: Jarvis Brown was signed as a free agent by the Reds.
 June 14, 1995: Jarvis Brown was sent by the Reds to the Baltimore Orioles as part of a conditional deal.
 July 21, 1995: Ricky Pickett, John Roper, Deion Sanders, Scott Service, and David McCarty were traded by the Reds to the San Francisco Giants for Mark Portugal, Dave Burba and Darren Lewis.
 July 25, 1995: Frank Viola signed as a free agent with the Cincinnati Reds.
 August 8, 1995: Mariano Duncan was selected off waivers by the Reds from the Philadelphia Phillies.

Roster

Player stats

Batting

Starters by position
Note: Pos = Position; G = Games played; AB = At bats; H = Hits; Avg. = Batting average; HR = Home runs; RBI = Runs batted in

Other batters
Note: G = Games played; AB = At bats; H = Hits; Avg. = Batting average; HR = Home runs; RBI = Runs batted in

Pitching

Starting pitchers
Note: G = Games pitched; IP = Innings pitched; W = Wins; L = Losses; ERA = Earned run average; SO = Strikeouts

Other pitchers
Note: G = Games pitched; IP = Innings pitched; W = Wins; L = Losses; ERA = Earned run average; SO = Strikeouts

Relief pitchers
Note: G = Games pitched; W = Wins; L = Losses; SV = Saves; ERA = Earned run average; SO = Strikeouts

Postseason

Game Log 

|- bgcolor="bbffbb"
| 1 || October 3 || @ Dodgers || 7–2 || Harnisch (1–0) || Martinez (0–1) || — || Dodger Stadium || 44,199 || 1–0
|- bgcolor="bbffbb"
| 2 || October 4 || @ Dodgers || 5–4 || Burba (1–0) || Osuna (0–1) || Brantley (1) || Dodger Stadium || 46,051 || 2–0
|- bgcolor="bbffbb"
| 3 || October 6 || Dodgers || 10–1 || Wells (1–0) || Nomo (0–1) || — || Riverfront Stadium || 53,276 || 3–0
|-

|- bgcolor="ffbbbb"
| 1 || October 10 || Braves || 1–2  || Wohlers (1–0) || Jackson (0–1) || McMichael (1) || Riverfront Stadium || 40,382 || 0–1
|- bgcolor="ffbbbb"
| 2 || October 11 || Braves || 2–6  || McMichael (1–0) || Portugal (0–1) || — || Riverfront Stadium || 44,624 || 0–2
|- bgcolor="ffbbbb"
| 3 || October 13 || @ Braves || 2–5 || Maddux (1–0) || Wells (0–1) || — || Atlanta–Fulton County Stadium || 51,424 || 0–3
|- bgcolor="ffbbbb"
| 4 || October 14 || @ Braves || 0–6 || Avery (1–0) || Schourek''' (0–1) || — || Atlanta–Fulton County Stadium || 52,067 || 0–4
|-

Farm system

Notes

References
1995 Cincinnati Reds season at Baseball Reference

Cincinnati Reds season
Cincinnati Reds seasons
National League Central champion seasons
Cinc